Alioune Ndour (born 3 March 2001) is a Senegalese professional footballer who plays as a forward for French  club Châteauroux on loan from the Portuguese side B-SAD.

Career
Ndour began his career in Senegal with FC Karack, before moving to the Czech Republic in 2019 with Vyskov. 

On 30 September 2019, Ndour moved to the United States, joining USL Championship side Loudoun United FC. On 7 January 2020, Loudoun announced Ndour would return for the 2020 USL season.

On 21 October 2020, Ndour joined Primeira Liga side Belenenses SAD on a 5-year deal.

On 2 September 2022, Ndour joined French club Châteauroux in Championnat National. The transfer is a loan for the 2022–23 season, to be followed by a permanent transfer and a two-year contract.

References

External links
Profile at USL Championship

2001 births
Footballers from Dakar
Living people
Senegalese footballers
Association football forwards
MFK Vyškov players
Loudoun United FC players
Belenenses SAD players
LB Châteauroux players
USL Championship players
Primeira Liga players
Liga Portugal 2 players
Campeonato de Portugal (league) players
Championnat National players
Senegalese expatriate footballers
Expatriate footballers in the Czech Republic
Senegalese expatriate sportspeople in the Czech Republic
Expatriate soccer players in the United States
Senegalese expatriate sportspeople in the United States
Expatriate footballers in Portugal
Senegalese expatriate sportspeople in Portugal
Expatriate footballers in France
Senegalese expatriate sportspeople in France